Venga a bailar el rock is a 1957 Argentine musical film. Is the first Ibero American film on rock and roll theme. Lalo Schifrin is one of the composers of the soundtrack, in his first movie participation.

Cast
Eber Lobato
Alberto Anchart (h)
Nélida Lobato
Gran Kiki
Delma Ricci
Osvaldo Castro
Pedrito Rico
Alfredo Barbieri
Amelita Vargas
Eddie Pequenino
Pablo Cumo
Luis Frontera
Martha Durán
Guillermo Brizuela Méndez
Fernando Campos
Ricardo Becher
Yamandú Di Paula
Carlos Irízar
Los Caribes
Los Big Rocker's
Ernesto y sus rockers
Hermanos Fernández

External links
 

1957 films
Argentine musical films
1950s Spanish-language films
Argentine black-and-white films
Films scored by Lalo Schifrin
1957 musical films
1950s Argentine films